Niklas Arrhenius (born September 10, 1982) is an American-Swedish track and field athlete who competes in the discus throw and shot put. He represented Sweden in the discus at 2008 Summer Olympics, was a four-time competitor at the World Athletics Championships (2007, 2011, 2013, 2017), and competed at five consecutive editions of the European Athletics Championships from 2006 to 2016. At the Swedish Athletics Championships he won seven national titles in discus, and was an eight-time champion in the shot put (combined indoors and outdoors).

Arrhenius is the son of Anders Arrhenius, who competed internationally in the shot put for Sweden. Niklas' younger brother, Leif Arrhenius is also a thrower. Arrhenius was born in Provo, Utah but has dual citizenship. While competing for Mountain View High School in Orem, Utah, Niklas was the national high school record holder for the discus for eight years, with a throw of 234 feet and 3 inches (breaking the previous record by nearly nine feet). He attended Brigham Young University where he was on the track and field team.

Arrhenius is a Latter-day Saint.  He served as an LDS missionary in the Sweden Stockholm Mission.

Having competed for Sweden internationally for most of his career, he transferred his eligibility to the United States in 2020.

Competition record

National titles
Swedish Athletics Championships
Shot put: 2009, 2010, 2011
Discus throw: 2004, 2006, 2007, 2010, 2011, 2012, 2013
Swedish Indoor Athletics Championships
Shot put: 2010, 2011, 2012, 2014, 2018
NCAA Division I Outdoor Track and Field Championships
Discus throw: 2007

Personal bests
 Discus throw: 66.22 m (2011)66.46m 2020
 Shot put: 19.75 m (2010)
 Shot put indoor: 19.91 m (2004)

See also
List of discus throw national champions (men)
Sweden at the 2011 World Championships in Athletics
Sweden at the 2012 European Athletics Championships
Sweden at the 2013 World Championships in Athletics
Sweden at the 2014 European Athletics Championships
Sweden at the 2016 European Athletics Championships
Sweden at the 2017 World Championships in Athletics

References

1982 births
Living people
Sportspeople from Provo, Utah
Track and field athletes from Utah
Swedish male shot putters
Swedish male discus throwers
American male shot putters
American male discus throwers
Olympic athletes of Sweden
Athletes (track and field) at the 2008 Summer Olympics
BYU Cougars men's track and field athletes
Mormon missionaries in Sweden
American Mormon missionaries in Sweden
Swedish Mormon missionaries
Latter Day Saints from Utah
Swedish Latter Day Saints
21st-century Mormon missionaries
American people of Swedish descent
Swedish people of American descent